Park Kun-Young  (Hangul: 박건영; born 14 March 1987) is a South Korean football player who formerly played for Daejeon Citizen as a defender.

Club career 
Park was selected by Daejeon Citizen as a draft player for the 2011 K-League season. Park earned a yellow card on his professional debut, in Daejeon's loss in Gyeongnam FC in a 2011 K-League Cup group match. Park made his league debut the following week, against Daegu FC.

Club career statistics

References

External links 

1987 births
Living people
Association football defenders
South Korean footballers
Daejeon Hana Citizen FC players
K League 1 players
Yeungnam University alumni